Borislav Asenov (born 16 June 1959) is a Bulgarian former cyclist. He competed in the individual road race and team time trial events at the 1980 Summer Olympics.

References

External links
 

1959 births
Living people
Bulgarian male cyclists
Olympic cyclists of Bulgaria
Cyclists at the 1980 Summer Olympics
People from Dobrich Province